George Summerville Ward (1867 - September 3, 1940), was president of the Ward Baking Company and he was vice president of the Brooklyn Tip-Tops, the Federal League baseball club.

Biography
Ward was born January 1, 1867, in Pittsburgh. He had a son, Walter Stevenson Ward, who in 1922, shot and killed a man named Clarence Melvin Peters, who he believed had been blackmailing him. George died on September 3, 1940 in Havana, Cuba.

References

Federal League executives
1867 births
1940 deaths